The Symphony No. 1 by Polish composer Krzysztof Penderecki was composed in 1973. It was published by Polish Music Publishing House and Schott Music and has never been expanded or revised.

Composition 

The composition was commissioned by Perkins Engines, one of the best known gas engine manufacturers in Peterborough, as part of a series of Annual Industrial Concerts. Penderecki started composing it in 1972. It would eventually premiere at Peterborough Cathedral on 19 July 1973, with the composer conducting the London Symphony Orchestra. Three months after its world premiere, it was performed in the composer's own country, at the Warsaw Autumn Festival by the Warsaw Philharmonic Orchestra under Witold Rowicki.

By the time the composition was finished, Penderecki stated that "I was then attempting to make a reckoning of my two decades' worth of musical experience – a time of radical, avant-garde seeking. It was the summa of what I could say as an avant-garde artist", claiming that the compositional style that he had been developing over the previous 15 years had reached its natural conclusion.

Structure 

The symphony consists of four continuous movements which take approximately 30 to 35 minutes to perform. This composition is scored for a large orchestra, consisting of 3 flutes (2 & 3 doubling piccolos), 3 oboes (3rd doubling cor anglais), 3 clarinets, bass clarinet, 3 bassoons (3rd doubling contrabassoon), 5 horns, 3 trumpets, 4 trombones, tuba, timpani, 5 percussionists playing 2 triangles, gong, 4 cymbals, 2 tam-tams, 6 tom-toms, 2 bongos, 2 congas, wooden drum, bass drum, woodblock, claves, ratchet, guiro, whip, vibraslap, 5 crotales, iron bar, 5 bells, glockenspiel, 5 Almglocken, harmonium, harp, celesta, piano and strings.  The movement list is as follows:

 I. Archi 1
 II. Dynamis 1
 III. Dynamis 2
 IV. Archi 2

References 

Symphonies by Krzysztof Penderecki
1973 compositions
Contemporary classical compositions